Dick Blanchard is a former linebacker in the National Football League. He played with the New England Patriots during the 1972 NFL season. He would move on to the Detroit Wheels in the World Football League in the 1974 Season.

References

Sportspeople from Waukesha, Wisconsin
Players of American football from Wisconsin
New England Patriots players
American football linebackers
Tulsa Golden Hurricane football players
1949 births
Living people
Sportspeople from the Milwaukee metropolitan area